Yuliya Barysik (born 11 February 1984) is a Belarusian judoka.

Achievements

External links
 

1984 births
Living people
Belarusian female judoka
Belarusian sambo practitioners
21st-century Belarusian women